Vasilisa Vladimirovna Volodina (Russian: Васили́са Влади́мировна Воло́дина; born April 16, 1974, Moscow) is a host on the Russian television show Let's Get Married since 2008.

She is a  Russian astrologer and a TV presenter.

References

External links
 Биография Василисы Володиной
 Интервью с Василисой Володиной

Living people
1974 births
Russian television presenters
Russian women television presenters
Mass media people from Moscow
Russian women psychologists